Explorations is a documentary TV series that looks into the many aspects of the human life with science, technology and research.

Three series have been broadcast.

Series 1 - 6 x 1hr, Series 2 - 13 x 1/2hr, Series 3 - 13 x 1/2hr.

It is an example of "advertiser funded programming", where Duracell fund the cost of production of the series, produced by Broadcast Marketing Ltd, London. Executive Producers for Broadcast Marketing, Bill Orde and Peter Telford.

The second series mainly focuses on daily life, ranging from food to fear to love. It provides interesting information and fact that usually do not come to people's minds, such as :

 How food changes the chemistry of the brain, affecting one's mood and ability to achieve. (Mood Food)
 The factors that cause attraction - Body shape, symmetry of a person's face and movement of a person. (First Impressions)
 How short-term stress can save one's life, and how long-term stress can be a slow and potential killer. (Stressed)
 The origins of phobia, how people react when they confront their fears head-on. (Primal Fear)

The first and the second series were broadcast in September 2003 and September 2004, respectively. The documentary is broadcast on the National Geographic Channel in the United States, BBC World, and cable/terrestrial channels elsewhere around the world. It is produced jointly by BBC Worldwide Ltd and Broadcast Marketing Ltd, United Kingdom.

References

2003 British television series debuts
2004 British television series endings
2000s British documentary television series
Documentary television series about science
English-language television shows
National Geographic (American TV channel) original programming